Heimo is a German and Finnish male given name. Notable people with this name include:

 Heimo Erbse (1924–2005), German composer
 Heimo Haitto (1925–1999), Finnish-American violinist
 Heimo Hecht (born 1961), Austrian sailor
 Heimo Korth, American outdoorsman
 Heimo Kump (born 1968), Austrian football player
 Heimo Müllneritsch (born 1947), Austrian slalom canoeist
 Heimo Pfeifenberger (born 1966), Austrian football player
 Heimo Reinitzer (born 1943), Austrian athlete
 Heimo Rekonen (1920–1997), Finnish politician
 Heimo Taskinen, Finnish ski-orienteering competitor
 Heimo Vorderegger (born 1966), Austrian football player
 Heimo Zobernig (born 1958), Austrian artist
 Heimo Grasser (born 1983), Austrian world traveler

See also
 Heimo (company), German producer of handpainted toy figurines and accessories

Finnish masculine given names